C. nigrescens may refer to:
 Calliophis nigrescens, the black coral snake, a venomous snake species found in the Western Ghats of India
 Crassispira nigrescens, a sea snail species
 Cryptotis nigrescens, the blackish small-eared shrew, a mammal species found in parts of Costa Rica, El Salvador, Guatemala, Honduras, Mexico and Panama

Synonyms 
 Commiphora nigrescens, a synonym for Commiphora angolensis, a shrub species found in Angola

See also